Margret Göbl (26 June 1938 – 21 June 2013) was a German pair skater. With her  husband Franz Ningel, she was the 1962 World bronze medalist, a three-time (1960–1962) European medalist, and a three-time (1960–1962) German national champion. The pair also finished fifth at the 1960 Winter Olympics in Squaw Valley. They were coached by Rosemarie Brüning.

Margret Göbl was born in Nürnberg, but grew up in Oberammergau. She lived in Frankfurt/Main and Duisburg with her husband Franz Ningel. She died in Essen, aged 74.

Competitive highlights

Pairs figure skating career
(with Franz Ningel)

References

1938 births
2013 deaths
German female pair skaters
Olympic figure skaters of the United Team of Germany
Figure skaters at the 1960 Winter Olympics
World Figure Skating Championships medalists
European Figure Skating Championships medalists